Igor Konnov (3 August 1954 – 2002) was a Russian rower. He competed in the men's eight event at the 1976 Summer Olympics.

References

1954 births
2002 deaths
Russian male rowers
Olympic rowers of the Soviet Union
Rowers at the 1976 Summer Olympics
Sportspeople from Tver